Amitabha Ghosh may refer to:

 Amitabha Ghosh (planetary geologist), Indian planetary geologist
 Amitabha Ghosh (academic, born 1941), Indian researcher, administrator and educator
 Amitav Ghosh, Indian writer